AGQ may refer to:

 Artland-Gymnasium Quakenbrück, school in Germany
 Aghem language, ISO-639-3 code
 Agrinion Airport, IATA code
 Arian Silver Corporation (TSX Venture Exchange symbol AGQ)
 Archives gaies du Québec (Quebec Gay Archives)
 Assemblies of God Queensland
 Attorney General of Quebec
 Attorney-General of Queensland
 Auditor General of Quebec
 Buss-Perry aggression questionnaire
 ProShares Ultra Silver, NYSE ticker symbol, a silver exchange-traded product

See also
 AG (disambiguation)